Natallia Safronava, née Klimovets (born 11 April 1974) is a Belarusian triple jumper.

Her personal best jump is 14.65 metres, achieved in June 2000 in Minsk. She has 6.66 metres in the long jump, achieved in July 2006 in Brest.

Achievements

External links

1974 births
Living people
Belarusian female triple jumpers
Athletes (track and field) at the 2000 Summer Olympics
Athletes (track and field) at the 2004 Summer Olympics
Olympic athletes of Belarus
Universiade medalists in athletics (track and field)
Universiade silver medalists for Belarus
Medalists at the 2001 Summer Universiade